Sfelinos is a village in the region of Serres, northern Greece. According to the 2011 Greek census, the village had 304 inhabitants.

History 

There are Acropolis ruins dating to the times of Alexander the Great near the village. In the wider area of the settlement, ancient findindings and tombs with rich burials have been found. Especially on a tall and steep hill, known to the older inhabitants by the name of "Grandisnos", located about 4 km north of the village, parts of walls and foundations of an ancient castle are preserved.

In 1866, the village was known as "Sfilinon" and had 725 Greek inhabitants. According to the statistics of the Bulgarian geographer Vasil Kanchov, the village had 720 Orthodox Greek inhabitants by 1900. The district of Sfelinos in the 1960s had 821 inhabitants and later in the 1880s and 90s it fell to 392, while in 2001 it increased to 448. Its inhabitants are engaged in agriculture, with the principal cultivation of tobacco, cereals, almonds and olives, as well as animal husbandry. Hunting is practised in the area as well.

References

External links 
Video showing the village from a drone

Populated places in Serres (regional unit)